Total Devastation is the debut studio album by American hip hop group Total Devastation. It was released on May 18, 1993 through PGA Records.

Track listing
 Legalize Today! - 1:06
 Hemp Rally - 4:04
 Many Clouds of Smoke - 5:28
 Da Soopa Doopa - 4:04
 Fat Blunt Caper (featuring Da Rhymeskeme) - 5:21
 Da Horny Man - 2:22
 Wonderful World Of Skins - 3:30
 Come Again - 3:00
 Cloud Nine - 3:51
 The D.G.F. Style (featuring Flymar & Whoop "D" Wham) - 5:35
 You'll Get Blasted - 3:20
 Zooted (featuring Nappy) - 5:44
 Hemp Hemp Hooray (Relegalize Today) (featuring Michael M. of H.E.M.P.) - 3:45
 Many Clouds of Smoke (Remix) - 5:28

Charts

References

External links

1993 debut albums
Hip hop albums by American artists